The Daags na de Tour (the former Ronde van Boxmeer) is a Criterium around the city of Boxmeer  in The Netherlands. Traditionally the race will take place the day after the Tour de France.

Winners

1975 Rik Van Linden	
1978 Jan Krekels	
1979 Gerrie Knetemann	
1980 Gerrie Knetemann	
1981 Ad Wijnands	
1982 Henk Lubberding	
1983 Peter Winnen	
1984 Ad Wijnands	
1985 Phil Anderson	
1986 Eric Vanderaerden	
1987 Adrie van der Poel	
1988 Gert-Jan Theunisse	
1989 Frans Maassen	
1990 Adrie van der Poel	
1991 Gianni Bugno	
1992 Claudio Chiappucci	
1993 Tony Rominger	
1994 Jean-Paul van Poppel
1995 Maarten den Bakker
1996 Bart Voskamp	
1997 Jan Ullrich	
1998 Michael Boogerd
1999 Lance Armstrong	
2000 Erik Dekker
2001 Erik Zabel
2004 Servais Knaven 	
2005 Michael Boogerd	
2007 Michael Boogerd	
2008 Koos Moerenhout	
2009 Andy Schleck	
2010 Lars Boom	
2011 Lars Boom	
2012 Vincenzo Nibali
2013 Bauke Mollema
2014 Lars Boom
2015 Wout Poels
2016 Bauke Mollema
2017 Dylan Groenewegen
2022 Mathieu Van Der Poel

References

Cycling events
Cycle races in the Netherlands
Cycling in North Brabant
Sport in Boxmeer